The Washington March may refer to:

1880s
 The Washington Post, a march composed by John Philip Sousa in 1889

1940s
 March on Washington Movement, a tool to organize a mass march from 1941 to 1946

1960s
 The March on Washington for Jobs and Freedom, one of the largest US human rights rallies and called for civil and economic rights for African Americans, on 28 August 1963

1970s
 March for Life (Washington, D.C.), an annual anti-abortion rally protesting abortion, on January 22 (or thereabouts) annually since 1974
 National March on Washington for Lesbian and Gay Rights, on October 14, 1979

1980s
 Second National March on Washington for Lesbian and Gay Rights, on October 11, 1987
 Washington March for Chinese Democracy, on October 1, 1989

1990s
 March on Washington for Lesbian, Gay and Bi Equal Rights and Liberation, on April 25, 1993

2000s
 Millennium March on Washington, an event to raise awareness and visibility of LGBT held from April 28 to April 30, 2000
 The Godless Americans March on Washington (GAMOW), on November 2, 2002
 Taxpayer March on Washington (also known as the 9/12 Tea Party), a Tea Party protest march on September 12, 2009